The Visconti Citadel of Bergamo is a mediaeval fortification in Bergamo, Lombardy, northern Italy. It was built in the 14th century by the Visconti of Milan and later expanded by the Colleoni of Bergamo. It lies in the western sector of the Città Alta (Upper Town).

History
In 1355, after expanding the Visconti domains and in order to consolidate his power on Bergamo, Bernabò Visconti initiated the construction of the Citadel. The Citadel incorporated a pre-existing fortress and a section of the nearby medieval walls. It thus became part of the defensive system of the Città Alta, strengthening the western sector on the San Giovanni hill and integrating the fortification in the eastern sector on Sant'Eufemia hill. The Citadel consisted of an enclosure fortified with towers. It was closed to the north by the Hospitio Magnum, the seat of the military garrison.

With the Venetian domination, the defensive strategy of the city changed, and the Citadel was abandoned as a fortress and put up for sale in lots. Mutilations led to the loss of elements of the ancient Visconti structure.  

Restorations undertaken from 1958 to 1960 began recovering the survived parts: the ancient, fortified nucleus of La Crotta with the imposing Adalberto tower; the Hospitio Magnum building and the arched portico; the tower at the entrance with the Cittadella Clock. The restorations have brought to light the typical Visconti lozenge decorations and frescoes of the 14th and 15th centuries. Further restorations undertaken from 1985 to 1988 recovered the remains of the Salt tower and other parts of the complex.

Today
The Citadel today hosts municipal services of social and cultural interest, such as the La Crotta public garden, the Civic Museum of Natural Sciences, the Civic Archaeological Museum, the Pocket Theater, the Institute of Geology, and the Montessori Center.

References

Sources

External links
Cittadella viscontea – complesso, Bergamo (BG)
Visit Bergamo, Bergamo official tourism website – Cittadella Viscontea

Castles in Lombardy